Keep It Gangsta is the second collaboration album by American rappers MC Eiht and Spice 1. The album was released on February 21, 2006 on Real Talk Entertainment.

Track listing 
"Spit at Em'" - 0:28
"No One Else" - 4:15
"Raw Wit It" - 4:23
"The Bossilini" - 1:16
"187 Hemp" - 2:54
"I'm Original" - 3:30
"No Chit Chat" - 4:34
"Let It Blow" - 3:57
"They Just Don't Know" - 3:40
"The Warning" - Young Jeezy - 0:27
"Revenge" - 4:03
"Ohh Shit" - 4:16
"Less Than Nothing" - 0:41
"That's the Way Life Goes" (Bonus Track) - 4:37

MC Eiht albums
Spice 1 albums
2006 albums
Real Talk Entertainment albums
Albums produced by Big Hollis
Collaborative albums